Rock and Roll Outlaws is the fourth album by Foghat, released in October 1974. The album cover shows a picture of the band near a Learjet in the Mojave Desert. Though the airplane displayed the band's logo, it did not belong to them; the band borrowed it and stuck on the logo.

Track listing
"Eight Days on the Road" (Michael Gayle, Jerry Ragovoy) - 6:08
"Hate to See You Go" (Dave Peverett, Rod Price) - 4:39
"Dreamer" (Peverett, Price) - 6:39
"Trouble in My Way" (Peverett) - 3:32
"Rock and Roll Outlaw" (Felix Cavaliere, Carman Moore) - 3:53
"Shirley Jean" (Peverett, Price) - 3:46
"Blue Spruce Woman" (David Anderson) - 4:08
"Chateau Lafitte '59 Boogie" (Peverett, Price) - 6:17

Charts

Certifications

References

1974 albums
Foghat albums
Bearsville Records albums
Rhino Records albums